Jaxson is a given name.

Notable people with the name "Jaxson" include

Jaxson Barham (born 1988), Australian rules footballer
Jaxson Dart (born 2003), American football player
Jaxson de Ville, American football mascot
Jaxson Hayes (born 2000), American basketball player
Jaxson Kirkland (born 1998), American football player
Jaxson Paulo (born 1999), New Zealand rugby league footballer
Jaxson Rahme (born 2003), Lebanese rugby league footballer
Jaxson Ryker (born 1982), American professional wrestler

See also
Jaxon (name), given name and surname
Jackson (name), given name and surname